Fonzaso is a comune (municipality) in the Province of Belluno in the Italian region Veneto, located about  northwest of Venice and about  southwest of Belluno.

Fonzaso borders the following municipalities: Arsiè, Feltre, Lamon, Pedavena, Seren del Grappa, Sovramonte.

Demographic evolution

References

Cities and towns in Veneto